Germantown is a town in Columbia County, New York, United States. The population was 1,936 at the 2020 census, down slightly from 1,954 in 2010. Germantown is located in the South West part of the county along the East side of the Hudson River.

History

Early indigenous history 
The area currently known as Germantown was originally occupied by the Mohicans. In the early eighteenth century, Hendrick Aupaumut recorded the movement of his people that had earlier brought them to settle along the rivers that would  later be named the Delaware and Hudson. Those who had continued north settled in the valley of the river they named the Mahicannituck (today's Hudson River), meaning the Waters That Are Never Still. They named themselves the Muh-he-con-neok after the river, a name that eventually evolved to the present day Mohican or Mahican.

The Mohicans settled in the valley, building wigwams and longhouses. The river and woodlands were abundant with life and food, which they supplemented with the corn, beans, and squash they grew. Mohican women were usually in charge of this agriculture, along with the homes and children, while men traveled to fish, hunt, or serve as warriors.

Colonization and European-Mohican relations 
In September 1609, Henry Hudson, a trader for the Dutch, sailed up the Mahicannituck. The valley was rich with beavers and otters whose fur the Dutch coveted, and in 1614 a trading post was established. As the fur trade expanded, making desired furs harder to find, tensions arose between the Mohicans and the Mohawk, who each sought to maintain their share in the fur trade and relations with European allies. Wars and their effects contributed to the loss of Mohican land to the point where territory in the Hudson Valley dwindled almost completely by the end of the seventeenth century. Mohicans were especially affected by European wars such as King Philip’s War where soldiers from Massachusetts and Connecticut attacked Mohicans. In general after war, Mohicans sold land to the Dutch in exchange for needed resources lost in the destruction of indigenous farming and preserved resources. As more and more Europeans arrived and settled on the land, the Mohicans’ self-reliance and reliance on the land was eroded by increased dependency on the settlers and their provisions. Settlers began dividing the land, establishing fences and boundary lines. Eventually, the Mohicans were driven from their territory west of the Mahicannituck and continued to move further east in the early 1700s.

Robert Livingston, a Scots immigrant, bought thousands of acres from the Native Americans. In 1683, Mohicans sold the first land parcel along the Roeliff Jansen Kill to Livingstone in exchange for goods as well as rights to hunting and fishing in the area. While Livingstone received a Mohican deed to the Tachkanick settlement in 1685, then built a house in 1689. These exchanges were the beginning of a trade relationship that lasted through 1768.

Moravian-Mohican relations 
In the summer of 1740, the first Moravian mission was established in the Mohican village of Shekomeko. Before that, Moravian missionary Christian Henry Rauch approached two Mohican leaders, Maumauntissekun (AKA Shabash) and Wassamapah, who were sojourning in New York City. Rauch wanted them to help bring Christianity to Mohican settlements. Maumauntissekun had a vision in 1739 where he and his Indian brethren laid dead in the woods. Because they suffered from alcoholism, he believed in the need for religion and temperance. Maumauntissekun agreed to bring Rauch to his town, Shekomeko. Initially, many Mohicans were skeptical of Rauch's presence because Mohican land had been bought in such great quantities by Europeans. Nevertheless, Maumauntissekun was among the first three Shekomeko residents to be baptized on Feb 11, 1742. Maumauntissekun then became known as Abraham of Shekomeko.

The Moravians lived among Mohicans in Dutchess County and Connecticut's Housatonic Valley. Many Moravians missionaries learned Mohican languages, while often in areas of strong English and German influence, they did not. Children of Mohican converts learned to read and write in Moravian schools. By the mid-eighteenth century, much of Mohican territory was divided by colonial powers, with the private property of others having displaced traditional communal lands. Although many Mohicans were divided on the new way of life, some adapted to it by converting to Christianity. Families often sent their children to be baptised and raised at Moravian headquarters in Bethlehem, Pennsylvania, due to high mortality rates of children from European diseases and war.

In the 1740s there were regional Indian raids on European settlements in New York and Massachusetts. Settlers believed that the French in Canada supplied Indians with weapons. Moravian missionaries were perceived as both allies of Canada and Indians, and were accused of disloyalty for fomenting the uprisings. When Moravian missionaries refused to enter colonial militias in early 1744 the New York colonial government issued a September 1744 order that discontinued Moravian missionary activities in the province.

Mohican-settler land disputes 
In the 1720s, white settlers began to survey Dutchess County land that they claimed according to exchanges originating from the Great Nine Partners Patent. The latter was a landholding of between 8 and 10 miles in width from east of the Hudson almost to Connecticut at the Oblong. It was granted to white settlers in May 1697 and the result of negotiations with Indians in eight grants from the Little Nine Partners Patent  signed in April 1706.

Abraham of Shekomeko (formerly known as Maumauntissekun or Shabash) protested the claims but was still willing to sell some land. His grievance was based on Mohican tradition: land that was not used is open for his people to continue hunting and fishing in the area. The Dutchess County territory being surveyed was unoccupied by white settlers for over four decades, making European claims de jure. The Mohicans, on the other hand, had been hunting and farming on the land for over two decades. According to a missionary memorandum recorded in 1743, Abraham went to New York City in 1724 where the governor promised to pay for Mohican land and leave them with a square mile for Mohican settlement. In September 1743 that square mile was divided by white settlers. In response, Abraham wrote to the governor disputing the unlawful claims. He tried to prove Mohican ownership by producing witnesses to the Little Nine Partners and even sent a petition around Shekomeko. In the end, the land was divided, and Abraham moved from the village site while Shekomeko was claimed by a proprietor.

Founding of Germantown 
In 1710, Robert Livingston sold  of his property to Anne, Queen of Great Britain, for use as work camps and resettlement of Palatine German refugees. Some 1,200 persons were settled at work camps to manufacture naval stores and pay off their passage as indentured labor. Known as "East Camp", the colony had four villages: Hunterstown, Queensbury, Annsbury, and Haysbury. The area was later renamed "Germantown". In 1775 Germantown was formed as a "district". Germantown was one of the seven original towns of Columbia County established by an act passed March 7, 1788. (The others were: Kinderhook, Canaan, Claverack, Hillsdale, Clermont, and Livingston).

In March 1845, a boat-load of people from East Camp, who had been to Hudson to make purchases, was run over first by a scow, and then by the steamboat South America. All nine individuals were lost.

Removal 

During the American Revolution the Mohicans supported the colonists but after the war concluded that they were not welcome in the area's villages. The Oneida offered them a portion of land and in the mid-1780s they began to move to the prayer town of New Stockbridge. Although the community thrived and the population grew steadily, land companies, hoping to make a profit from the land inhabited by Indigenous communities, proposed that New York State remove all Native Americans from within its borders. In 1822 agents from New York, missionaries, and commissioners from the War Department negotiated with the Menominee and Ho-Chunk communities of Wisconsin for a tract of land on which to relocate the indigenous tribes of New York. In the following years, members of the community were relocated to Shawano County, Wisconsin, and settled on the reservation land. The modern Stockbridge-Munsee Community comprises the descendants of these and other bands and tribes relocated people.

Geography
The western town line, marking the center of the Hudson River, is the border of Greene and Ulster counties.

Demographics

As of the census of 2000, there were 2,018 people, 831 households, and 546 families residing in the town.  The population density was 166.0 people per square mile (64.1/km2). There were 984 housing units at an average density of 81.0 per square mile (31.3/km2). The racial makeup of the town was 96.93% White, 1.14% Black or African American, 0.15% Native American, 0.45% Asian, 0.40% from other races, and 0.94% from two or more races. Hispanic or Latino of any race were 1.29% of the population.

There were 831 households, out of which 28.3% had children under the age of 18 living with them, 53.7% were married couples living together, 7.5% had a female householder with no husband present, and 34.2% were non-families. 28.8% of all households were made up of individuals, and 14.0% had someone living alone who was 65 years of age or older. The average household size was 2.41 and the average family size was 2.95.

In the town, the population was spread out, with 23.1% under the age of 18, 6.0% from 18 to 24, 27.1% from 25 to 44, 25.8% from 45 to 64, and 18.1% who were 65 years of age or older. The median age was 42 years. For every 100 females, there were 94.4 males.  For every 100 females age 18 and over, there were 95.5 males.

The median income for a household in the town was $42,195, and the median income for a family was $50,885. Males had a median income of $36,806 versus $26,250 for females. The per capita income for the town was $22,198. About 5.0% of families and 7.9% of the population were below the poverty line, including 9.3% of those under age 18 and 5.7% of those age 65 or over.

Points of interest

Germantown Library

The library was first founded in 1948 by the Germantown Garden Club and Emily Finger Lappe in the town hall across from the current post office.  It was run by volunteers for two years.  In 1950,  the town hired their first librarian, Bessie Muller-Babcock and she was paid $100 a year.  When the town hall moved in 1980, the library moved with it until it became apparent that the library had outgrown the space. 

In February 2008, the library moved to its new permanent space. This building included dedicated spaces for children, young adults, media, and adults. At the same time, the Hover Room opened to the public for library programs, classes, and town meetings. In 2015, a maker space area was added to the library, the first of its kind in Columbia County.  Three years later, the maker space expanded to meet patron interest and needs. It moved to the lower level, where it occupies half of the floor.

When Covid hit and the library was forced to close its doors, all of their programs went online.  Patrons were able to apply for and instantly get a library card online in order to access materials.  Hoopla was added to the range of services the library offers to give patrons more online choices.  In addition to Hoopla, the library also offers Kanopy, Overdrive, Libby, Mango Languages, RB Digital Magazines, online Newspapers, and many other things.  Free wifi can be accessed 24/7 and special senior citizen hours are available on Tuesdays and Fridays.

National Register of Historic Properties listings
The Barringer–Overbaugh–Lasher House, Clermont State Historic Site, Clermont Estates Historic District, Charles H. Coons Farm, Dick House, German Reformed Sanctity Church Parsonage, Hudson River Heritage Historic District, Stone Jug, and Simeon Rockefeller House are listed on the National Register of Historic Places.

 List of local businesses
 Gaskins 
 Otto's Market 
 Tousey Winery + Clermont Cafe
 Boating + Fishing: two access points to the Hudson River: Cheviot Park off State Rt. 9G and Lasher Memorial Park in North Germantown
 Germantown Library
 Palatine Park (playground, Little League + soccer fields, Kellner Community Activities Center, “Dog Bark” dog park)
 Pop's Universe
 Central House B&B
 Gatherwild

Local news sources
 Rural Intelligence
 The Columbia Paper

Notable people
Corbin Bernsen, actor
Dow Hover, New York State executioner
Amanda Pays, actor, interior designer (one of many homes) 
Sonny Rollins, saxophonist
Oliver Stone, film director
Daniel Day-Lewis, actor

Communities and locations in Germantown 
Cheviot – A hamlet near the Hudson River, south of Germantown hamlet.
Germantown – The hamlet of Germantown is located near the Hudson River on Route 9G.
North Germantown – A hamlet on Route 9G, north of Germantown hamlet.
Palatine Park – A park northeast of Germantown hamlet.
Viewmont – A hamlet on the southern town line.

Nearby attractions
 Bard College
 Hudson
 Olana State Historic Site
 Catskill Hiking
 Karma Triyana Dharmachakra, Inc
 Van Alen House, Kinderhook, NY

References

External links

 Town of Germantown official website
 Germantown Central School District
 Historical information about Germantown
 Germantown Library

Palatine German settlement in New York (state)
New York (state) populated places on the Hudson River
Towns in Columbia County, New York